Danica Prodanović (née Radojičić / Радојичић; born 5 August 1989), is a Serbian Doctor of Pharmacy, researcher and part-time singer, known by her nickname Nina (Нина ).

She represented Serbia in the Eurovision Song Contest 2011 with the song "Čaroban", composed by Kristina Kovač, and placed fourteenth in the final.

Life and career

Early life and career (1989–2010) 
Nina was born as Danica Radojčić on 5 August 1989 in Belgrade (Yugoslavia then, Serbia now). She has an older brother, Stefan. Nina began playing the piano aged six, and also attended dance classes. She finished both elementary and secondary musical school, but she entered pharmacy at the University of Belgrade. She has performed in various clubs with her band "Legal Sex Department". Nina cites "Duffy, Muse, and other pop and alternative artists" as her major influences.

Eurovision Song Contest and debut album (2011–present) 
On 19 January 2011, Radio Television of Serbia (RTS) announced that the three members of the Kovač family — Kornelije, Aleksandra and Kristina — would compose three songs that would compete to represent Serbia in the Eurovision Song Contest 2011. On 16 February, it was confirmed that Kristina Kovač had chosen Nina, then an unknown singer, to perform her song "Čaroban". Kovač discovered Nina thanks to YouTube. On 26 February, Nina was chosen for the Serbian entry at the Eurovision Song Contest 2011 in Düsseldorf, Germany, with more than 15,000 SMS votes.

In March, Nina recorded the English version of the song, called "Magical".  On 9 April, she performed at the Eurovision In Concert in Amsterdam to promote her song, along with 19 other participants. At the Eurovision Song Contest, Nina performed sixth in the first semi-final, after Yüksek Sadakat from Turkey and before Alexey Vorobyov from Russia, and qualified for the final. She performed the 24th in the final, after Mika Newton from Ukraine and before Eldrine from Georgia, and placed 14th.

In June 2011, Nina announced she would release her debut studio album through the PGP RTS. In an interview for OGAE Serbia, Nina stated that she had moved to Melbourne, Australia and that she was currently pursuing her PhD in immunopharmacology. She also stated that the plans to record an album through the PGP RTS had been scrapped.

Discography 
 2008 — "Dokaži da me voliš"
 2011 — "Čaroban"
 2016 — "Colors of my love"
 2020 — "Nemoćna"

See also 
 Eurovision Song Contest 2011
 Serbia in the Eurovision Song Contest
 Serbia in the Eurovision Song Contest 2011

Publications 
 Prodanovic D, Keenan CR, Langenbach S, Li M, Chen Q, Lew MJ, et al. Cortisol limits selected actions of synthetic glucocorticoids in the airway epithelium. FASEB J. 2017;
 Xia YC, Radwan A, Keenan CR, Langenbach SY, Li M, Radojicic D, et al. Glucocorticoid Insensitivity in Virally Infected Airway Epithelial Cells Is Dependent on Transforming Growth Factor-β Activity. PLoS Pathog. 2017;13(1). 
 Keenan CR, Radojicic D, Li M, Radwan A, Stewart AG. Heterogeneity in mechanisms influencing glucocorticoid sensitivity: The need for a systems biology approach to treatment of glucocorticoid-resistant inflammation. Vol. 150, Pharmacology and Therapeutics. 2015. p. 81–93.

References 

1989 births
Serbian pharmacists
Eurovision Song Contest entrants of 2011
Living people
Singers from Belgrade
Eurovision Song Contest entrants for Serbia
21st-century Serbian women singers
Serbian pop singers
Serbian emigrants to Australia
People from Belgrade in health professions